Muhammad Danial Haqim bin Draman (born 29 August 1998) is a Malaysian professional footballer who plays as a central midfielder for Malaysia Super League club Sabah.

Originally from Pasir Mas, Kelantan, Danial began his career with Kelantan U19 in 2015 at age 17. In June 2017, he moved to Kelantan U21 before being promoted to Kelantan first team in March 2018.

Danial made his first team debut on 14 April 2018 where he played for 90 minutes.

Career statistics

Club

References

External links
 

Living people
1998 births
People from Kelantan
Malaysian people of Malay descent
Malaysian footballers
Kelantan FA players
Johor Darul Ta'zim II F.C. players
Association football midfielders
Malaysia Super League players
Competitors at the 2019 Southeast Asian Games
Malaysia youth international footballers
Southeast Asian Games competitors for Malaysia